The Boletineae are a suborder of the fungal order Boletales. Families in the Boletineae include the Boletaceae and the Paxillaceae.

Taxa

Paxillaceae
Alpova
Austrogaster
Gyrodon
Hydnomerulius
Meiorganum
Melanogaster
Paragyrodon
Paxillus
Boletaceae
Afroboletus
Aureoboletus
Australopilus
Austroboletus
Boletellus
Boletochaete
Boletus
Borofutus
Bothia
Chalciporus
Chamonixia
Corneroboletus
Fistulinella
Gastroboletus
Gymnogaster
Harrya
Heimioporus
Heliogaster
Hemileccinum
Leccinellum
Leccinum
Mycoamaranthus
Octaviania
Phylloboletellus
Phylloporus
Porphyrellus
Pseudoboletus
Pulveroboletus
Retiboletus
Rhodactina
Rossbeevera
Royoungia
Sinoboletus
Solioccasus
Spongiforma
Strobilomyces
Sutorius
Tubosaeta
Tylopilus
Veloporphyrellus
Xanthoconium
Xerocomellus
Xerocomus
Zangia

References

Boletales